Chaumes  is a cow's milk cheese from Saint-Antoine-de-Breuilh in the Périgord (South West of France), made by traditional cheese-making processes. Translated literally, "chaumes" is French for stubble.

Based upon traditional Trappist-style cheeses, it is a rather popular cheese among modern French varieties, in particular with children. It is a soft pale cheese with a rich full-bodied flavour and smooth creamy and quite rubbery texture. Its aroma comes from the soft rind, which has a bright tangerine-orange color. The rind appears after several washings of the crust, along with brushing with some ferments.

Maturation of the Chaumes takes four weeks. It is used as a table cheese and also for grilling. It is also available in limited markets around France as a spreadable cream cheese, "Chaumes la Crème".

See also
List of French cheeses
List of cheeses

References

Occitan cheeses
Cow's-milk cheeses